Ipswich is an unincorporated community located in the town of Elk Grove, Wisconsin, Lafayette County Wisconsin, United States.

History
A post office called Ipswich was established in 1886, and remained in operation until it was discontinued in 1921. The community was named after Ipswich in England via Ipswich, Massachusetts.

Notes

Unincorporated communities in Lafayette County, Wisconsin
Unincorporated communities in Wisconsin